Andrew McLean (born 18 July 1973) is a former Australian rules footballer who played for St Kilda in the Australian Football League (AFL) in 1996. He was recruited from the North Launceston Football Club in the Tasmanian Football League (TFL) with the 6th selection in the 1996 Pre-season Draft. Mclean also played for the Norwood Football Club in the SANFL and won a mail medal at the Encounter Bay Football Club in 2004. McLean is now part of the Scotch Oakburn College Australian Rules Football coaching panel, and has since lead this team to multiple premierships in 2018 and 2019 over The Hutchins School.

References

External links

Living people
1973 births
St Kilda Football Club players
North Launceston Football Club players
Australian rules footballers from Tasmania